Avondale Grange is a two-member ward within Kettering Borough Council, created by boundary changes that took effect in 2007. The ward was last fought at Borough Council level in the 2007 Kettering Council election on 3 May 2007, when both seats were won by Labour.

The current councillors are Cllr. Linda Adams and Cllr. Clark Mitchell.

Councillors
Kettering Borough Council Elections 2015
Linda Adams (Labour)
Clark Mitchell (Labour)

Current Ward Boundaries (2007-)

Kettering Borough Council Elections 2007
Note: due to boundary changes, vote changes listed below are based on notional results.

See also
Kettering
Kettering Borough Council

Electoral wards in Kettering